George Bowker Underwood (November 4, 1884 – August 28, 1943) was an American athlete who competed in the 1904 Summer Olympics.

He competed for the United States in the 1904 Summer Olympics held in St Louis, United States in the 4 mile team where he won the gold medal with his teammates Arthur Newton, Paul Pilgrim, Howard Valentine and David Munson.

Underwood also finished fourth in the 800 metres competition and participated in the 400 metres event where his result is unknown.

References

External links
profile

1884 births
1943 deaths
American male long-distance runners
Olympic gold medalists for the United States in track and field
Athletes (track and field) at the 1904 Summer Olympics
Medalists at the 1904 Summer Olympics